Kelvin Tavares Cato (born August 26, 1974) is an American former professional basketball player. A 6'11" center from the University of South Alabama and Iowa State University, Cato played in the NBA as a member of the Portland Trail Blazers, Houston Rockets, Orlando Magic, Detroit Pistons, and New York Knicks.

College career 
Cato was an obscure player averaging six points and six rebounds at the University of South Alabama in 1992–93.  At that time, he struck up a relationship with then University of New Orleans coach Tim Floyd, who recognized Cato's potential.  In 1994, Floyd took over as head coach at Iowa State University and convinced Cato to transfer to Iowa State.  Cato averaged 11 points, eight rebounds and four blocks per game for an Iowa State team that reached the Sweet Sixteen of the 1997 NCAA basketball tournament.

NBA career 
Drafted 15th overall in the 1997 NBA draft by the Dallas Mavericks, Cato's draft rights were immediately traded to the Portland Trail Blazers for the draft rights to Chris Anstey and cash considerations.  Cato averaged 3.8 and 3.5 points per game in his two seasons in Portland before being bundled in a six-for-one deal with the Houston Rockets that sent Scottie Pippen to the Blazers.

He spent five years in Houston, averaging a career-high 8.7 points per game in 1999–2000, and started all but two of the games he played in both the 2001–02 and 2003–04 seasons. On October 28, 1999, Cato signed a six-year, $42,000,000 contract extension that increased in controversy as his playing statistics cooled. With Yao Ming as the Rockets' new starting center, the Rockets traded Cato in a seven-player deal that sent Steve Francis, Cuttino Mobley, and Cato to the Orlando Magic for Tracy McGrady, Juwan Howard, Tyronn Lue, and Reece Gaines. While he started 50 games in the 2004–05 season for the Magic, his playing minutes went down significantly the following season as he battled shoulder injuries.

On February 15, 2006, Cato, along with the Magic's first-round pick in the 2007 NBA draft, was traded to the Detroit Pistons for center Darko Miličić and point guard Carlos Arroyo. Cato finished out the season with the Pistons. He signed with the New York Knicks for the 2006–07 season.

External links
NBA.com Profile – Kelvin Cato

1974 births
Living people
American men's basketball players
Basketball players from Atlanta
Centers (basketball)
Dallas Mavericks draft picks
Detroit Pistons players
Houston Rockets players
Iowa State Cyclones men's basketball players
New York Knicks players
Orlando Magic players
Portland Trail Blazers players
South Alabama Jaguars men's basketball players
People from Lithonia, Georgia